Meleh Kabud-e Olya (also Romanized as Meleh Kabūd-e ‘Olyā; also known as Maleh Kabood, Maleh Kabūd, and Mullah Kabūd) is a village in Kakavand-e Sharqi Rural District, Kakavand District, Delfan County, Lorestan Province, Iran. At the 2006 census, its population was 212, in 48 families.

References 

Towns and villages in Delfan County